Ahmad Salihijo Ahmad (born October 20, 1983) is a Nigerian Engineer and renewable energy advocate. He is the current Managing Director of Nigerian Rural Electrification Agency.

Early life and family
Ahmad Salihijo was born on October 20, 1983 to the family of Late Mr. Ahmad Salihijo from Adamawa State, a foremost consultant to Petroleum Development Fund(PTF). He is the first son of Mr. and Mrs Ahmad Salihijo.

Educational background
He attended Essence International School, Nigeria and British Secondary School of Lome, Togo and later got admission to study Electronic and Electrical Engineering at University of Leeds, UK and graduated in 2006. He furthered his education to Masters on Project Planning and Management from CADD Abuja and Masters in Development Studies at Nigerian Defence Academy, Kaduna, Nigeria in 2008 and 2018 respectively.

Career
Between 2009 and 2012, Ahmad, a renewable energy advocate, worked with Infrastructure Concession Regulatory Commission (ICRC) and Subsidy Reinvestment and Empowerment Program (SURE-P), respectively. At SURE-P, he led the development of a project that empowered over 50, 000 Nigerian youth.

He served as the Special Adviser to the Nigerian Minister of Environment, Federal Ministry of Environment, Amina Mohammed, and was the coordinator of Nigerian Green Board Program during which he coordinated for the issuance of Africa's first Sovereign Green Bonds valued for over 10 billion NGN.

He was at the forefront of originating and developing 2x50MW grid-connected solar photovoltaic power plants with oversight for licensing and permits

He was the Executive Director Operations at eN Consulting and Projects Limited; and in December, 2019 the President of Nigeria,  Muhammadu Buhari appointed him to head Rural Electrification Agency after his predecessor Mrs Damilola Ogunbiyi got appointed as the Chief Executive Officer of Sustainable Energy for All and Special Representative of the Secretary-General for Sustainable Energy for All, and Co-Chair of UN-Energy.

Community impact
He was the chairman/founder of FlexiSaf Foundation, a nonprofit organization that provides educational services and supports to less privileged children, including Almajiri children in Northern Nigeria. In 2019, he led his team to set up a school known as Accelerator Learning Program (ACCLEARN) at Rugga Village Wuye, Abuja to teach out-of-school children.

Under his leadership at Nigeria's Rural Electrification Agency (REA) he emphasized the improvement in providing access to electricity in the rural communities which resulted in 99,000 connections, impacted over 450,000 people and created over 5,000 Jobs and also leading to the agency successfully securing $550 million in funding for electrification projects across the country just in 1 year of his appointment. In less than 2 years of his appointment he also ensured the actualization of additional projects in areas such as 100KWp Isolated Solar Hybrid Mini Grid at Eka-Awoke, Ikwo LGA, Ebonyi state, two Mini Grid at Nnewi (7.5kwp); In Anambra state, Electrification projects in Malumfashi LGA, Malumfashi/Kafur Federal Constituency (Unguwar Dutse Town); Katsina, 30KWp Solar Mini Grid, at Bambami, also in Katsina; Electrification of Ifesowapo in Ajilola, Ede South LGA, Osun west senatorial district; 100KWp solar Hybrid Mini Grid at Olooji community, Ijebu East, Ogun state.

Recognition
He was enlisted in 2021 among Nigeria's Under 50 Leaders in Public Service alongside his Executive Director, Sanusi Ohiare who oversees the Rural Electrification Fund (REF) of the agency. The duo were also listed with other top young leaders who are under the age of 50 years and occupy significant leadership positions in Nigeria's government including Ahmad Rufai Zakari, Hadiza Bala Usman,  Aishah Ahmad, Terhemen Tarzoor, Abdulrasheed Bawa, Elijah Onyeagba, Ogechukwu Modie and Yewande Sadiku.

External links
 BBC Media Action Visits FlexiSaf

References

1983 births
Living people
Nigerian engineers
Nigerian political people
People from Adamawa State